Trivalea-Moșteni is a commune in Teleorman County, Muntenia, Romania. It is composed of three villages: Brătășani, Deparați (Schela until 2001) and Trivalea-Moșteni.

Natives
 Ion Pistol

References

Communes in Teleorman County
Localities in Muntenia